Norbert Nottny Növényi (born 15 May 1957) is a Hungarian light heavyweight wrestling Olympic champion of the 1980 Summer Olympics, two times kickboxing world champion and currently an actor in Hungary. In January 2009, he became the oldest WFCA mixed martial arts world champion.

Acting career
He appeared in a minor role in the Hollywood film Red Heat, which starred Arnold Schwarzenegger. He played a Moscow thug who was smuggling cocaine in his artificial leg. He played a longer role in Péter Tímár's satire Zimmer Feri in 1997. He also attended a drama course of Mária Gór-Nagy. His longest role was in Az Alkimista és a Szűz (The Alchemist and the Virgin, 1999) by Zoltán Kamondi. He played the role of the title virgin's boyfriend. He also appeared in the award-winning Taxidermia by György Pálfi.

Sport titles

2009 W.F.C.A. world champion (MMA)
1987 W.A.K.O. World Championships Munich  +91 kg (Full-Contact)
1980 Olympic Games Moscow  -90 kg (Wrestling)

External links
 

1957 births
Living people
Sport wrestlers from Budapest
Olympic wrestlers of Hungary
Wrestlers at the 1980 Summer Olympics
Wrestlers at the 1992 Summer Olympics
Hungarian male sport wrestlers
Olympic gold medalists for Hungary
Olympic medalists in wrestling
Medalists at the 1980 Summer Olympics
Hungarian male film actors
Male actors from Budapest
20th-century Hungarian people